Edmonton Manning is a federal electoral district in Alberta, Canada, that has been represented in the House of Commons of Canada since 2015.

Edmonton Manning was created by the 2012 federal electoral boundaries redistribution and was legally defined in the 2013 representation order. It came into effect upon the call of the 42nd Canadian federal election, which took place on October 19, 2015. It was created out of parts of the electoral districts of Edmonton—Sherwood Park, Edmonton East and Edmonton—St. Albert.

Geography
Edmonton Manning is located in the northeast corner of Edmonton.

Demographics
According to the Canada 2011 Census

Ethnic groups: 59.0% White, 7.4% Chinese, 7.1% Indigenous, 6.3% South Asian, 5.7% Black, 3.6% Filipino, 2.8% Southeast Asian, 2.7% Arab, 2.6% Latino, 1.1% West Asian, 1.7% Other
Languages: 67.1% English, 6.1% Chinese, 2.3% Arabic, 2.3% Punjabi, 2.2% Spanish, 1.9% French, 1.9% Vietnamese, 1.7% Ukrainian, 1.6% Tagalog, 1.5% Polish, 1.2% Portuguese, 1.1% Hindi, 1.1% Italian, 8.0% Other
Religions: 57.3% Christian, 7.5% Muslim, 3.2% Buddhist, 2.5% Sikh, 1.3% Hindu, 0.3% Other, 27.9% None
Median income: $35,715 (2010) 
Average income: $42,332 (2010)

Members of Parliament

This riding has elected the following members of the House of Commons of Canada:

Election results

References

Alberta federal electoral districts
Politics of Edmonton